Wrestle Peter Pan 2022 was a professional wrestling event promoted by CyberFight's sub-brand DDT Pro-Wrestling (DDT). It took place on August 20, 2022, in Tokyo, Japan, at the Ota City General Gymnasium. The event aired on CyberAgent's AbemaTV online linear television service and CyberFight's streaming service Wrestle Universe. This was the fourteenth event in the Peter Pan series and the fourth promoted under the "Wrestle Peter Pan" name.

Production

Background
Since 2009, DDT began annually producing shows in the Ryōgoku Kokugikan held in the summer, following the promotions financial success of the first event. This led to the event becoming DDT's premier annual event and one of the biggest event on the independent circuit of Japanese wrestling. Since 2019, the event was renamed "Wrestle Peter Pan".

Storylines
The event featured nine professional wrestling matches that resulted from scripted storylines, where wrestlers portrayed villains, heroes, or less distinguishable characters in the scripted events that built tension and culminated in a wrestling match or series of matches.

Event
The show portraited three title matches, one of them marking a title change. The first one saw Joey Janela retaining the DDT Extreme Championship against Shunma Katsumata to secure his fourth consecutive defense. Yuki Ueno succeeded in winning the DDT Universal Championship for the second time in his career after defeating Masahiro Takanashi. The main event saw Kazusada Higuchi defending the KO-D Openweight Championship for the first time against Tetsuya Endo who relinquished the title one month earlier due to injury, with this being considered his rightful rematch.

Results

References

External links
The official DDT Pro-Wrestling website

DDT Peter Pan
DDT Pro-Wrestling shows
CyberAgent
2022 in professional wrestling
August 2022 events in Japan
Events in Tokyo
Professional wrestling in Tokyo